Miloslav Kousal (born 29 October 1978) is a Czech former football striker.

During his career he played for Czech clubs FC Viktoria Plzeň and SK Kladno in the Czech First League, Slovenian Publikum Celje, Israeli Hapoel Kiryat Shmona F.C., Albanian KS Vllaznia Shkodër and Cypriot Ayia Napa FC.

References

External links
 Stats from Slovenia at PrvaLiga.

Living people
1978 births
Sportspeople from Kladno
Association football forwards
Czech footballers
Czech First League players
Cypriot Second Division players
FC Viktoria Plzeň players
SK Kladno players
NK Celje players
KF Vllaznia Shkodër players
Ayia Napa FC players
Expatriate footballers in Slovenia
Czech expatriate sportspeople in Slovenia
Expatriate footballers in Israel
Expatriate footballers in Albania
Expatriate footballers in Cyprus
Expatriate footballers in Germany
SV Germania Schöneiche players
Berliner FC Dynamo players
Czech expatriate sportspeople in Cyprus
Czech expatriate sportspeople in Albania
Czech expatriate sportspeople in Germany
Czech expatriate sportspeople in Israel
Czech expatriate footballers